Mafileo Kefu (born 5 February 1983 in Brisbane, Australia) is a rugby union footballer who played for RC Toulon and US Dax in France. He is the younger brother of former Wallabies number eight Toutai Kefu and Centre Steve Kefu, and son of Tongan Rugby star Fatai Kefu.
More recently, he has played at Bay of Plenty in New Zealand, and returned to Souths in Brisbane after returning to Australia in 2012.
It was at his house in France that Sonny Bill Williams stayed after controversially defecting from the NRL to play rugby for Toulon.

Notes

1983 births
Living people
Australian sportspeople of Tongan descent
Australian rugby union players
RC Toulonnais players
Expatriate rugby union players in France
Tonga international rugby union players
Australian expatriate rugby union players
Australian expatriate sportspeople in France
People educated at Brisbane State High School
Rugby union players from Brisbane
Rugby union centres